[[File:The Doans Gang Front Book Cover From Annals Of The Revolution Or A History Of The Doans By H.K. Brooke 1843.png|thumb|right|225px|The Annals of the Revolution; or, a History of the Doans was a popular 19th-century account of the Doans Gang that contributed to their folklore in the form of a dime novel.]]

The Doan Outlaws, also known as the "Doan Boys" and "Plumstead Cowboys", were a notorious gang of brothers from a Quaker family most renowned for being British spies during the American Revolutionary War.

The Doans were Loyalists from a Quaker family of good standing.  The "Doan Boys" reached manhood at the time of the American Revolutionary War. Growing up in Plumstead, Pennsylvania, the Doans excelled athletically. The Doan gang's principal occupation was robbing Whig tax collectors and horse theft.  The gang stole over 200 horses from their neighbors in  Bucks County that they sold to the Red Coats in Philadelphia and Baltimore.  The Friends Meeting House's cemetery in Plumsteadville is protected by a field stone wall that runs around its perimeter. Levi and Abraham Doan were buried just outside this wall because the pacifist Quakers refused to bury militants within their graveyard (a veteran of the Civil War is likewise buried outside the graveyard perimeter). The graves are adorned with their original native brownstone headstones which bear no inscriptions, following the Quaker practice at the time of their death, as well as newer headstones that identify them as outlaws.

Background

Bucks County, Pennsylvania in 1776
Bucks County, an area sympathetic to the Doan Outlaws with a large loyalist population, grew out of William Penn's "holy experiment", and was guided more by Quaker "inner light" than by the traditional "rights of Englishmen". As a result of Penn's effort to create a "nation of nations," almost half of colonial Pennsylvania was non-English. In nearby Philadelphia, the elite Proper Philadelphians were rich, charming, tolerant, but had relinquished the role of governing the city.  Philadelphia, by common agreement, was the largest, most cosmopolitan but also the most poorly governed city in the Colonies.  Bucks County, when compared to Massachusetts in support for a war with England, was still "The Peaceable Kingdom". No doubt Pennsylvanians were outraged by the actions of the Crown, but they were more likely to express their discontent through resolutions than violent protests.  Many Pennsylvanians remained skeptical about cutting ties with England right up to the signing of the Declaration of Independence.  To illustrate this, the fighting in "Penn's Woods" started seven years after the Boston Massacre.  As for the non-English Pennsylvanian,  King George III, even at his worst, was better than what they had known in their homeland. Fat Pennsylvania's legendary prosperity helped ease discord.  Bucks County could boast rich farmland, large supplies of fresh water, timber, iron, fire clay, game, and their famous fieldstone for building.    The common New Englander by contrast had to choose between hard-scrabble farming or dangerous fishing off rock-ribbed coasts.Puritan Boston and Quaker Philadelphia by E. Digby Baltzell 

Timeline
In the fall of 1770, Moses Doan left his home in anger after an argument with his father Joseph Sr.  A few days later he saved the family of the young girl he loved from an Indian attack, but his subsequent declaration of love for her was rebuffed.  Around this time he joined a small band of local Indians of the Wolf clan of the Lenni Lenape tribe.  It is believed that he stayed with them for several months, hunting and engaging in feats of strength with them which he always won.
In 1774 Moses enlisted his brothers, Aaron, Levi, Mahlon, Joseph and his cousin Abraham to his gang.  A handwritten note by Etta Holloway, great-granddaughter of Joseph Doan, tells the story of the outlaws this way:

They were all of the Quaker faith and did not believe in war. The new government levied a tax upon Joseph, Sr., the father of the Tory Doan boys, confiscated his farm, threw his wife, 3 daughters and youngest son off of the land, jailed Joseph Sr. for non payment of taxes and branded him on his hand as a criminal. This was the given reason for the start of the notorious group known as the Tory Doans.

However, the Pennsylvania Archives date the forfeiture of Joseph Doan's home as August 13, 1782, after the conclusion of the Revolution, and 10 months after the Doan gang robbed the treasury at Newtown.
In July 1776 Moses and Levi met with General William Howe and offered themselves as spies. Moses earned the nickname "Eagle Spy".
In July 1776, most able-bodied men marched off to war, leaving the area unprotected.
On August 27, 1776, Moses Doan informed General Howe of the unprotected Jamaica Pass and helped Howe defeat Washington at the Battle of Long Island.
On December 25, 1776, Moses may have delivered this note to Colonel Rahl's headquarters: "Washington is coming on you down the river, he will be here afore long. Doan". Colonel Rahl never read this note, and Washington kept the element of surprise.  He was able to cross the Delaware River with the Continental Army and handily win the pivotal Battle of Trenton.
On 6/15/1778 Joseph Doan Sr was listed as a traitor (relisted on 11/28/1783), along with 200 other men. Aaron Doan, Mahlon Doan and Moses Doan were listed as traitors on a 7/30/1778 supplemental list.
On June 7, 1780, Abraham Doan killed a woman in her home with her nine fearful children huddled around her. While this statement is listed in several sources, there is no confirmation of this event, and in fact, the woman's husband had refuted it.  However, a 1788 broadside about Abraham and Levi Doan did state that a victim (a French gentleman who owned a store on the Susquehanna) did die of wounds incurred from the gang. The gang is documented in the PA archives with threatening to kill collectors.
On October 22, 1781, the Doan gang robbed the Bucks County Treasury in Newtown of 1,307 pounds sterling, equal to £ today.  This was three days after Cornwallis surrendered at Yorktown on October 19.  The monies were never recovered.
In the next year, the Doan gang is documented to have robbed nine other collectors.
In June 1783 Moses Doan and Abraham Doan and others robbed "several" Bucks County tax collectors in their homes. A 100-pound reward was offered for their apprehension.
On July 26, 1783 Moses Doan, Abraham Doan, Levi Doan, Mahlon Doan and others robbed two Bucks county tax collectors and four Bucks citizens at night in their homes. The 100-pound reward, equal to £ today, was reiterated.
On August 28, 1783, an armed posse of 14 men was formed when word was received of the Doan gang whereabouts. Abraham and Levi Doan escaped; Moses Doan was killed while resisting arrest.  One posse member, Major Kennedy, was struck in the back by a bullet from a Doan gun, and died from the injuries three days later.
On August 28, 1783 there was a note found in Moses Doan's pocket threatening the murder of the Speaker of the House and Patriot Muhlenberg if Joseph Doan was not released from the Philadelphia prison.
On September 14, 1783 the reward was increased to 300 pounds per outlaw.
Moses Doan's gravestone was moved by a farmer and currently lies in a hedgerow in Plumstead Township, badly weathered by the elements.
In 1783 Mahlon escaped from a Bedford, Pennsylvania jail and made his way to safety in New York City.
In 1784 Joseph Jr. escaped from a Newtown jail under sentence of death for murder.  Joseph Jr. changed his name and posed as a New Jersey schoolteacher for nearly a year before his real identity was discovered.  Joseph Jr. then fled to Canada.
On May 17, 1787 Aaron Doan, who had been sentenced to hang for outlawry, was pardoned on the condition he leave America and never return.
On September 24, 1788, Levi Doan and his cousin Abraham Doan confessed to aiding the British and were hanged in Philadelphia.

Removed image gallery.

The Doan myth

Moses riding his horse off the cliffs of Fleesedale Road (today Fleecydale Rd. in Solebury Township, Pennsylvania)
Never sneak up on a Doan dead or alive.
Two million dollars in buried treasure
 The Doans were polarizing figures. Loyalists wrote of the Doan gang as if they were Robin Hood. Patriots referred to them as demons. No doubt their success as spies, horsemen, runners, jumpers, their bravery, and their numerous criminal exploits hardened both views.

In popular culture
An American historical drama television series about the Doan Outlaws, America's Original Outlaws, is currently in development as of August 2019. It is being produced by Mark I. McNutt.

McNutt’s company Envy Media Com is also producing a documentary preview to the narrative series America's Original Outlaws. Tentatively titled Outlaw Treasure: Mystery of the Doan Gang, principal filming wrapped in December 2021. The documentary explores the many Doan legends, including the discovery of a previously unexplored Doan cave and hideout. It is currently in post-production.

References

SourcesThe War for Independence and the Transformation of American SocietyThe New Doan Book by George MacReynoldsEarly History of Washington's Crossing, and Its Environs by Warren S. Ely of Doylestown p. 386Watson's Annals of Philadelphia and Pennsylvania, 1857 - Area History: Chapter 13 - Part II, Vol IIThe Tavern at the Ferry by Edwin Tunis pages 59–102The Doan Gang: The Remarkable History of America's Most Notorious Loyalist Outlaws by Terry A. McNealy Between the lines: banditti of the American Revolution by Harry M. WardEncyclopedia of frontier biography, Volume 4'' by Dan L. Thrapp

External links
The Doan Outlaws of Bucks County - The Life and Times of the Plumstead Cowboys, by Peter Mulcahy
Captain Robert Gibson Jr - Patriot, gang member, or spy?
 The Doan Gang, Pennsylvania Historical Marker, Waymarking.com
 America's Original Outlaws - Incredible True Story of America's First Outlaw Gang - Doan Gang, AmericasOriginalOutlaws.com

American Quakers
Crime families
Outlaw gangs in the United States
People from Bucks County, Pennsylvania
Loyalists in the American Revolution from Pennsylvania
British spies during the American Revolution